The effects of Hurricane Dorian in the Bahamas in 2019 were among the worst experienced for any natural disaster in the country. Hurricane Dorian struck the Abaco Islands as a Category 5 hurricane on September 1, and a day later hit Grand Bahama Island at the same category. The hurricane then stalled over Grand Bahama for another day, finally pulling away from the island on September 3. Damage amounted to US$3.4 billion, and there were at least 74 deaths in the country. Another 282 people were left missing after the hurricane.

Preparations

As early as August 26, the National Hurricane Center (NHC) warned for the potential of then–Tropical Storm Dorian to affect the Bahamas within five days, noting uncertainty due to potential interaction with Hispaniola. By August 28, the NHC was forecasting for Dorian to pass near the northern Bahamas as a major hurricane. On August 30, the government of the Bahamas issued a hurricane watch, and later that day a hurricane warning, for the northwestern Bahamas, including the Abacos, Berry Islands, Bimini, Eleuthera, Grand Bahama Island, and New Providence. A hurricane watch was also issued for Andros Island. The warnings were downgraded after Dorian moved away from the country on September 3.

Forced evacuations were issued for the Abacos and Grand Bahama on August 31 as Dorian intensified while tracking towards the Bahamas. In low-lying cays, government officials went from door to door urging residents to move inland. Skiffs rented by the Bahamian government shuttled residents of outlying fishing communities to McLean's Town in Grand Bahama. Most major resorts were forced to close. Nine hurricane shelters were opened on Grand Bahama and 15 shelters were opened on the Abacos. Some chose to shelter at resorts instead, despite warnings by government officials that the buildings were unsafe. Prime Minister of the Bahamas Hubert Minnis warned people to "not be foolish and try to brave out this hurricane", later adding that those that did not evacuate "are placing themselves in extreme danger and can expect a catastrophic consequence". Airports in the Abacos, Grand Bahama, and Bimini were closed by September 1. Government workers were ordered to stay indoors once winds outside reached tropical storm-force.

Impact

On September 2, the eye of Dorian moved over the eastern end of Grand Bahama Island, and drifted across the island. Dorian also dropped an estimated  of rain over the Bahamas.

Hurricane Dorian killed at least 70 people in the Bahamas – 60 on Abaco and 10 on Grand Bahama. One of the fatalities was classified as indirect. Damage amounted to US$3.4 billion. Insured losses alone were confirmed to be at least US$1 billion. Across the Bahamas, the storm left at least 70,000 people homeless. An estimated 13,000 homes, constituting 45% of the homes on the Abacos and Grand Bahama, suffered severe damage or were completely destroyed.

Abaco Islands

Hurricane Dorian knocked out the power, water, telecommunications, and sewage service on the Abacos. For several days, Marsh Harbour Airport on Great Abaco was underwater, and the control tower was damaged by the waters. The airport was closed on September 4. About 90% of the infrastructure in Marsh Harbour was damaged. The shantytowns of Marsh Harbour, housing mostly poor Haitian immigrants, were completely destroyed. In central and northern Abaco, Dorian severely damaged roadways, as well as thousands of houses, with 60% of homes in northern Abaco damaged or destroyed. The power grid serving the entirety of the Abacos was destroyed. The terminal building of Treasure Cay Airport suffered significant damage.

Grand Bahama
There was an island-wide power outage on Grand Bahama Island, and an oil refinery was damaged. About 300 homes on the island were destroyed or severely damaged, with the heaviest damage on the eastern side of the island. At least 60% of Grand Bahama Island was left submerged as Dorian moved away on September 3. Grand Bahama International Airport went underwater by 07:00 UTC September 2, with water levels reaching . Strong winds at the airport severely damaged buildings and aircraft, leaving debris strewn across the airport and surrounding roads. Floodwaters and sewage contaminated Rand Memorial Hospital. The operating room, intensive care unit, and the wards were rendered unusable after being tainted by sewage, while mold outbreaks after the floodwaters receded forced more parts of the hospital to be evacuated. The two main supermarkets in Freeport, as well as their warehouses, were inundated by storm surge.

Elsewhere
At 11:24 UTC on September 2, 2019, total power was lost on the island of New Providence. The following day, by 1:50 (UTC), 40% of power had been restored.

Aftermath

The National Emergency Management Agency of the Bahamas (NEMA) handled the response to the hurricane, working with the Caribbean Disaster Emergency Management Agency. In the days after Dorian affected the Bahamas, officials surveyed the damage by air. Residents in the Abacos and Grand Bahama suffered from water shortages, power outages, and a lack of telecommunications; these conditions created difficulty in handling the logistics of the disaster. After the storm, at least 2,000 people stayed in government shelters. Thousands of people left Abaco and Grand Bahama in the days after the storm, with the Department of Rehabilitative Welfare Services in New Providence recording 6,854 evacuees entering Nassau by air from September 5–13. Several cruise companies redirected their ships to bring aid and transport passengers off the affected islands. Bahamasair offered free flights out of Abaco and Grand Bahama beginning September 5, though some passengers said they still had to pay. The Royal Bahamas Defence Force and the Royal Bahamas Police Force were deployed to Grand Bahama and Abaco via boat. Widespread looting, however, still occurred in the immediate aftermath of the hurricane.

On September 5, the Central Emergency Response Fund of the United Nations provided US$1 million for initial emergency aid. The World Food Programme sent a team of 15 experts to coordinate emergency operations. The agency also provided power generators and 14,700 ready-to-eat meals. The Caribbean Catastrophe Risk Insurance Facility paid the Bahamas about US$10.9 million on September 6, due to the country's insurance policy being activated. Télécoms Sans Frontières was the first non-governmental organization (NGO) on Abaco, which worked to re-establish satellite connection. The Pan American Health Organization sent a team of doctors, nurses, and 34 tons of medical equipment for a three-month stay in the country. On September 8, the Pan American Health Organization launched a $3.5 million appeal to cover health care related needs in the country. The International Organization for Migration provided 1,000 tarpaulins to the country. Team Rubicon Canada disaster response volunteers arrived on Grand Bahama and Great Abaco Islands on Sept 17 and joined teams from the US and UK in providing disaster response. The majority of the Team Rubicon Canada efforts were centered on clearing debris at key facilities and structures in Marsh Harbour.

The United Kingdom pledged £1.5 million to support the RFA Mounts Bay, which delivered emergency supplies and a helicopter. The government of the British Virgin Islands pledged US$100,000 to the Bahamas. The United States provided four helicopters to assist in search and rescue operations, while their Coast Guard also helped to rescue residents trapped by floodwaters. The Netherlands announced on September 5 that they would send two naval ships with supplies from nearby Sint Maarten. On September 6, Canada sent a CC-130J Hercules aircraft to Nassau, joining the Jamaican Defence Force's Disaster Assistance Response Team. Canada also pledged C$500,000 in humanitarian aid. Meanwhile, Canadian-based charity GlobalMedic sent in volunteers carrying water purification units and emergency hygiene kits. Japan provided tents and blankets through their Japan International Cooperation Agency. India announced it would send US$1 million in aid on September 8, while South Korea sent US$200,000 in humanitarian assistance the next day.

On September 11, NEMA reported that 2,500 people were still missing; this figure was revised down to 1,300 the next day. Impacts were minimal, however, as the strongest winds and rain were on the eastern flank of Humberto and thus stayed away from the Bahamas. As of September 15, about 2,100 people remained in 20 shelters across New Providence, Grand Bahama, and Abaco.

The Ministry for Disaster Preparedness, Management, and Reconstruction in Nassau received $3.6 million-worth of modular shelters, medical evacuation boats, and construction materials from the United States embassy in Nassau. This donation was an addition to what was nearly $38 million in assistance from the United States to disaster recovery in The Bahamas since Hurricane Dorian.

Death toll and search for survivors
As of December 22, 2019, the known death toll is 70, with officials indicating the true toll may be more than 600. The lead physician for northern Abaco, Latoya Munroe, stated the official death toll excludes undocumented Haitian immigrants living in the Mudd and surrounding areas and reported seeing 80–100 bodies herself. The number of missing persons fell from 1300 the third week of September to under 300 in October, when it was last updated. Police Commissioner Anthony Ferguson stated that the final toll from the hurricane will likely never be known, although when the National Hurricane Center's final report was released, estimates of between 200 and 300 were given. Fifty-five unidentified bodies were buried on May 22 after being in a refrigeration trailer since the hurricane. In a statement on June 9, 2020, former Health Minister Dr. Duane Sands raised concerns over the handling of the missing persons list. According to him, thousands of names were removed without reason after the Royal Bahamas Police Force took over.

Within a week of the hurricane's impact U.S. and Canadian urban search and rescue teams were deployed across Abaco and Grand Bahamas. Morgues in Abaco and Nassau reached capacity within a week of the hurricane, necessitating the use of refrigerated shipping containers. Bahamian officials advised rescuers to mark corpses' locations rather than collect them, which was also necessary for canine teams unable to confirm finds obscured under debris. Corpses remained buried under debris for nearly three weeks after the hurricane, with decomposition leading to reports of overwhelming miasma in many communities.

See also

Effects of Hurricane Andrew in The Bahamas – another Category 5 hurricane to affect the country
Hurricane Dorian
Hurricane Lorenzo – the second Category 5 hurricane of the 2019 season

References

External links

ReliefWeb: Hurricane Dorian - Aug 2019

Dorian
Bahamas
2019 in the Bahamas
Dorian